Events from the year 1978 in the United States.

Incumbents

Federal government 
 President: Jimmy Carter (D-Georgia)
 Vice president: Walter Mondale (D-Minnesota)
 Chief justice: Warren E. Burger (Minnesota)
 Speaker of the House of Representatives: Tip O'Neill (D-Massachusetts)
 Senate Majority Leader: Robert Byrd (D-West Virginia)
 Congress: 95th

Events

January
 January 1 
 The Copyright Act of 1976 takes effect, making sweeping changes to United States copyright law.
 Edward M. Davis retires from the Los Angeles Police Department, after 30 years on the force and more than 8 years as its police chief.
 January 6 – The Holy Crown of Hungary (also known as the Crown of St. Stephen) is returned to Hungary from the United States, where it was held since World War II.
 January 14–15 – The body of former U.S. Vice President Hubert Humphrey lies in state in the Capitol Rotunda, following his death from cancer.
 January 14 – The Sex Pistols hold their last concert, at the Winterland Ballroom in San Francisco.
 January 15 – Ted Bundy commits an infamous murder and assault at the Chi Omega Sorority House at Florida State University.
 January 15 – The Dallas Cowboys defeat the Denver Broncos at Super Bowl XII
 January 16 – Robert F. Rock succeeds Edward M. Davis as the LAPD's interim chief.
 January 19 – Federal Appeals Court Judge William H. Webster is appointed Director of the Federal Bureau of Investigation.
 January 25–27 – The Great Blizzard of 1978 strikes the Ohio Valley and the Great Lakes, causing 51 deaths in Ohio.
 January 28 – Richard Chase, the "Vampire of Sacramento", is arrested.

February

 February 1 – Hollywood film director Roman Polanski flees to France to avoid sentencing after pleading guilty to unlawful sex with a minor.
 February 5–7 – The Northeastern United States blizzard of 1978 hits the New England region and the New York metropolitan area, killing about 100 and causing over US$520 million in damage.
 February 6 – The first Home Depot opens in Marietta, Georgia.
 February 8 – United States Senate proceedings are broadcast on radio for the first time.
 February 9 – The Budd Company unveils its first SPV-2000 self-propelled railcar in Philadelphia, Pennsylvania.
 February 11 – Sixteen Unification Church couples wed in New York, New York.
 February 15 – Serial killer Ted Bundy is recaptured in Pensacola, Florida.
 February 16 
The Hillside Strangler, a serial killer prowling Los Angeles, claims a 10th and final victim.
The first computer bulletin board system (CBBS) is created in Chicago.
 February 24 – Five men with mild mental-health issues from Yuba City, California disappear in the snow on their way home from a basketball game. In June, four of the bodies are discovered in the Sierra. The fifth, Gary Mathias, is never found. The circumstances surrounding their deaths remains a mystery.

March
 March 3 – The New York Post publishes an article about David Rorvik's book The Cloning of Man, about a supposed cloning of a human being.
 March 6 – American porn publisher Larry Flynt is shot and paralyzed in Lawrenceville, Georgia.
 March 22 – Karl Wallenda of the Flying Wallendas dies after falling off a tight-rope between two hotels in San Juan, Puerto Rico.
 March 28 – Stump v. Sparkman (435 U.S. 349): The Supreme Court of the United States hands down a 5–3 decision in  a controversial case involving involuntary sterilization and  judicial immunity.

April
 April 2 – The CBS soap opera Dallas is launched. It is set to be aired later this year in several countries, including the United Kingdom by the BBC.
 April 3 – The 50th Academy Awards ceremony, hosted by Bob Hope for the final time, is held at Dorothy Chandler Pavilion in Los Angeles. Woody Allen's Annie Hall wins Best Picture, with Allen winning Best Director. George Lucas' Star Wars wins six awards, while Fred Zinnemann's Julia and Herbert Ross' The Turning Point both receive eleven nominations each.
 April 7 – U.S. President Jimmy Carter decides to postpone production of the neutron bomb – a weapon which kills people with radiation but leaves buildings relatively intact.
 April 10 – The Volkswagen Westmoreland Assembly plant near New Stanton, Pennsylvania is dedicated, having begun production of the Rabbit, the North American version of the Volkswagen Golf, the previous week. Volkswagen thus becomes the second non-American automobile manufacturer (after Rolls-Royce in 1921–1931) to open a plant in the United States. (The plant closes in 1988.)
 April 18 – The U.S. Senate votes 68–32 to turn the Panama Canal over to Panamanian control on December 31, 1999.
 April 25 – St. Paul, Minnesota becomes the second U.S. city to repeal its gay rights ordinance after Anita Bryant's successful 1977 anti-gay campaign in Dade County, Florida.
 April 27 – Willow Island disaster – In the deadliest construction accident in United States history, 51 construction workers are killed when a cooling tower under construction collapses at the Pleasants Power Station in Willow Island, West Virginia.
 April 28 – WAC abolished; women integrated into regular Army.

May
 May 5 – Pete Rose of the Cincinnati Reds gets his 3,000th major league hit.
 May 20 – Mavis Hutchinson, 53, becomes the first woman to run across the U.S.; her trek took 69 days.
 May 25 – A bomb explodes in the security section of Northwestern University, wounding a security guard (the first Unabomber attack).
 May 26 – In Atlantic City, New Jersey, Resorts International, the first legal casino in the eastern United States, opens.
 May 28 – Indianapolis 500: Al Unser wins his third race, and the first for car owner Jim Hall.

June
 June 6 – California voters approve Proposition 13, which slashes property taxes nearly 60%.
 June 9 – The Church of Jesus Christ of Latter-day Saints extends the priesthood and temple blessings to "all worthy males", ending a general policy of excluding "Canaanites" from priesthood ordination and temple ordinances.
 June 10 – Affirmed becomes only the 11th horse to ever win the Triple Crown by defeating Alydar in the 110th running of the Belmont Stakes.
 June 12 – Serial killer David Berkowitz, the "Son of Sam," is sentenced to 365 years in prison.
 June 16 – The musical film Grease is released, starring 24-year-old New Jersey born actor John Travolta and 29-year-old British-Australian actress and singer Olivia Newton-John.
 June 19 – Garfield, which eventually becomes the world's most widely syndicated comic strip, makes its debut nationwide.
 June 25 – The rainbow flag of the LGBT movement flies for the first time (in its original form) at the San Francisco Gay Freedom Day Parade.
 June 28 
 The U.S. scientific satellite Seasat is launched.
 University of California Regents v. Bakke: The Supreme Court of the United States bars quota systems in college admissions but affirms the constitutionality of programs which give advantages to minorities.
 June 29 – Actor Bob Crane is found bludgeoned to death in his Scottsdale, Arizona, apartment. The crime is never solved.

August
 August 2 – President Jimmy Carter declares an unprecedented state emergency and evacuation immediately following the revelation that Niagara Falls, New York neighborhood Love Canal was built on a toxic waste dump.
 August 12 – During a preseason game against the Oakland Raiders, New England Patriots wide receiver Darryl Stingley sustains a spinal cord injury on a hit from Jack Tatum, leaving Stingley a quadriplegic. He will die from complications of his injury on April 5, 2007.
 August 13 – The 5.8  Santa Barbara earthquake affected the central coast of California with a maximum Mercalli intensity of VII (Very strong), causing 65 injuries and $12 million in financial losses.
 August 17 – Double Eagle II becomes the first balloon to successfully cross the Atlantic Ocean, flying from Presque Isle, Maine, to Miserey, France.

September

 September 17 – Camp David Accords: Menachem Begin and Anwar Sadat begin the peace process at Camp David, Maryland.
 September 18 – WKRP in Cincinnati premieres on CBS.
 September 25 
PSA Flight 182, a Boeing 727, collides with a small private airplane and crashes in San Diego, California; 144 are killed.
Giuseppe Verdi's opera Otello makes its first appearance on Live from the Met, in a complete production of the opera starring Jon Vickers. This is the first complete television broadcast of the opera in the U.S. since the historic 1948 one.

October
 October 2 – The New York Yankees defeat the Boston Red Sox 5–4 at Fenway Park to clinch the AL East after being 14 games out of first place only two months earlier.  The Yankees would eventually go on to defeat the Kansas City Royals and Los Angeles Dodgers and win the World Series.
 October 4 – Pier 39 opens on Fisherman's Wharf, San Francisco, as a tourist attraction.
 October 10 – U.S. President Jimmy Carter signs a bill that authorizes the minting of the Susan B. Anthony dollar.
 October 14 – President Jimmy Carter signs a bill into law which allows homebrewing of beer in the United States.
 October 17 – The New York Yankees clinch their 22nd World Series championship, defeating the Dodgers 7–2 in Los Angeles and winning the Series 4 games to 2.
 October 27 – President Jimmy Carter signs the Humphrey–Hawkins Full Employment Act, adjusting the government's economic goals to include full employment, growth in production, price stability, and balance of trade and budget.

November
 November 7 – California voters defeat the Briggs Initiative that would have prohibited gay school teachers.
 November 10 – Theodore Roosevelt and Badlands National Park is established.
 November 17 – The Star Wars Holiday Special airs on CBS; this is its first and only airing.
 November 18 – Mass murder/suicide of 909 Americans in Jonestown, Guyana under the direction of Jim Jones.
 November 19 – The first U.S. Take Back the Night march occurs in San Francisco.
 November 27 – In San Francisco, California, Mayor George Moscone and City Supervisor Harvey Milk are assassinated by former Supervisor Dan White.

December
 December 3 – The Southern Crescent passenger train derails at Shipman, Virginia, killing six and injuring 60.
 December 4 – Dianne Feinstein succeeds the murdered George Moscone as San Francisco, California's first woman mayor (she serves until January 8, 1988).
 December 11 – Lufthansa heist: Six men rob a Lufthansa cargo facility in New York City's Kennedy airport.
 December 13 – The first Susan B. Anthony dollar enters circulation.
 December 15 
 Cleveland, Ohio becomes the first major American city to go into default since the Great Depression, under Mayor Dennis Kucinich.
Superman is released in theaters in the United States.
 December 22 – Chicago serial killer John Wayne Gacy, who is subsequently convicted of the murder of 33 young men, is arrested.

Full date unknown
Colantonio Incorporated, a general contractor is founded in Massachusetts.
San Francisco City Guides, a non-profit organization is founded.

Ongoing
 Cold War (1947–1991)
 Détente (c. 1969–1979)
 1970s energy crisis (1973–1980)

Births

January

 January 2 – Karina Smirnoff, Ukrainian-born dancer
 January 3
 Kimberley Locke, singer
 Shawnna, rapper
 January 5
 America Olivo, actress
 January Jones, actress
 January 6
Casey Fossum, baseball player
Bubba Franks, football player
 January 7 – Kevin Mench, baseball player
 January 9 
Chad Johnson, football player and actor
AJ McLean, pop singer/songwriter and member of the Backstreet Boys
 January 10
 Bang Belushi, rapper
 Niya Butts, basketball player and coach
 Brent Smith, singer and frontman for Shinedown
 Tamina Snuka, professional wrestler and actress
 January 11
 Lazare Adingono, Cameroonian-born basketball player and coach
 Mark Aylor, rugby player
 January 12
 Stephen Abas, wrestler and mixed martial artist
 Jeremy Camp, Christian singer/songwriter  
 January 13
 Aaron Boone, football player
 Nate Silver, statistician, psephologist and writer
 January 14
 Eddie Berlin, football player
 Shawn Crawford, Olympic sprinter
 January 15 – Eddie Cahill, actor
 January 18
 J Anthony Allen, composer and producer
 Daniel Alvarez, soccer player
 January 19
 Amanda Augustus, tennis player
 Matt Brass, politician
 January 20 – Joy Giovanni, wrestler, model, and actress
 January 21
 Chris Brown, football player
 Phil Stacey, singer and American Idol contestant
 January 23
 Stephanie Arnold, Olympic archer
 Jason Bishop, illusionist and magician
 E. Kidd Bogart, songwriter, music publisher, and record executive
 Josh Thompson, country singer
 January 24 – Kristen Schaal, actress, comedian, and writer
 January 25
 Jenny Benson, soccer player
 Ben Brown, blogger
 Liz Carey, actress, comedian, personality, podcaster, and writer
 B. J. Whitmer, wrestler
 January 26
 Jake Arians, football player
 Kelly Stables, actress
 January 27
 Aaron Best, football player and coach
 Jonathan Byrd, golfer
 January 28 – Big Freedia, musician
 January 29
 Rob Bironas, football player (d. 2014)
 Arūnas Bižokas, Lithuanian-born ballroom dancer
 Brian Windhorst, basketball journalist
 January 30 – Donald Barrett, drummer
 January 31 – Brad Rutter, game show champion (Jeopardy!)

February

 February 1 – Dusty Bergman, baseball player
 February 2 
 Eden Espinosa, actress and singer
 Chris 'Romanski' Romano, actor, writer, producer, and director
 Rich Sommer, actor
 February 3
 Rashon Burno, basketball player and coach
 Adrian R'Mante, actor
 Eliza Schneider, actress
 Kelly Sullivan, actress
 February 5
 Ikaika Anderson, politician
 Nick Allen Brown, author
 Brian Russell, football player
 February 7
 Tom Blankenship, bassist for My Morning Jacket
 Ashton Kutcher, screen actor and venture capitalist
 February 8 – Donald Betts, politician
 February 9
 David Allen, football player
 Clarice Assad, Brazilian-born composer, pianist, arranger, singer, and educator
 February 10
 Nick Basile, director, producer, actor, and screenwriter
 David Berry, entrepreneur and business executive
 Cedrick Bowers, baseball player
 Reshea Bristol, basketball player
 February 11
 Andrew Bayes, football player
 Laurel Braitman, science historian and writer
 Brent Butler, baseball player
 February 12 – Busdriver, rapper
 February 13 – Mike Brown, football player
 February 14
 Courtney Brown, football player
 Patrick J. Bumatay, judge
 Danai Gurira, actress and playwright
 Richard Hamilton, basketball player
 February 16
 Bassnectar, DJ and record producer
 John Tartaglia, actor
 February 17 – Jacob Wetterling, kidnapping victim
 February 18 – Winny Brodt-Brown, ice hockey player
 February 19
 Antimc, hip hop producer
 Matt Bettinelli-Olpin, director, writer, actor, and musician
 Immortal Technique, Peruvian-born rapper
 Kenyatta Wright, football player
 February 20
 Lauren Ambrose, actress and producer
 Jay Hernandez, actor and fashion model
 February 21
 Erick Barkley, basketball player
 Kumail Nanjiani, Pakistani-born actor and comedian
 Nicole Parker, actress, comedian, writer, podcaster, and singer
 February 22 – Gus Sorola, actor and podcast host
 February 24
 Corey Benjamin, basketball player
 John Nolan, singer-songwriter and guitarist
 T. W. Shannon, politician
 DeWayne Wise, baseball player
 February 25
 Big Ali, rapper and songwriter
 Darren Soto, politician
 February 26 – Molly Antopol, fiction and nonfiction writer
 February 27
 Stephanie Baldwin, beauty queen
 James Briggs, keyboardist for The Aquabats
 Adam Kinzinger, politician

March

 March 1
 Jensen Ackles, actor
 Joe Block, radio and television announcer
 Mya Byrne, singer/songwriter
 Donovan Patton, actor, television host, and singer
 March 2
 Sebastian Janikowski, football player
 Mike Naig, politician
 March 3
 Yeremiah Bell, football player
 Antonio Brown, football player
 Matt Diaz, baseball player
 March 4 – Nate Ackerman, British-born mathematician and wrestler
 March 6
 Mike Jackson, politician
 Sage Rosenfels, football player
 March 7 – Mike Reese, politician (d. 2021)
 March 8 – Nick Zano, actor
 March 9
 Nathan Beard, politician
 LaKeysia Beene, soccer player
 MickDeth, bassist and guitarist (d. 2013)
 March 10 – Benjamin Burnley, singer and frontman for Breaking Benjamin
 March 12
 Camille Anderson, actress, model, and television host
 Neal Obermeyer, editorial cartoonist
 Claudio Sanchez, alternative rock musician and writer for Coheed & Cambria
 March 13
 Ben Allen, politician
 Jason Bergmann, strongman competitor
 Tom Danielson, cyclist
 Kenny Watson, football player
 March 14 – Anna Astvatsaturian Turcotte, Azerbaijani-born writer, lecturer, philanthropist, and activist
 March 15 – Marshal Dutton, singer/songwriter, guitarist, and frontman for Hinder
 March 16
 Ed Ableser, politician
 Jake Bailey, make-up artist and photographer (d. 2015)
 Brooke Burns, fashion model and actress
 Matthew Montgomery, actor
 March 17
 Dan Alexander, football player
 Jason Baker, football player
 Patrick Seitz, voice actor
 March 18 – Antonio Margarito, Mexican-born boxer
 March 19 – Jason Barrett, politician
 March 20
 Mike Bynum, baseball player
 Mark Alan Lee, Navy SEAL (d. 2006)
 March 21
 Jeff Bajenaru, baseball player
 La Chat, rapper
 March 22 – Josh Heupel, football player
 March 23
 Nicholle Tom, actress
 Perez Hilton, actor and blogger
 March 24 – Amir Arison, actor
 March 27 – Dee Brown, baseball player
 March 28 – Case Brittain, attorney and politician
 March 29 – Eric Bruntlett, baseball player
 March 30 – Josh Bard, baseball player
 March 31 – Sonia Chang-Díaz, politician

April

 April 1
 Brian Allen, football player
 Jason Bell, football player and TV pundit
 April 2
 Nick Berg, businessman and beheading victim (d. 2004)
 John Gall, baseball player
 Scott Lynch, author
 Jaime Ray Newman, actress, producer, and singer
 April 3 – Mehrsa Baradaran, Iranian-born law professor
 April 4 – Jason Ellison, baseball player
 April 5
 Brandon Backe, baseball player
 Gerard Bush, director, writer, producer, author, and activist
 Stephen Jackson, basketball player
 April 6
 Bro Safari, moombahton, trap, and dubstep producer
 Tim Hasselbeck, football player
 Lauren Ridloff, actress
 April 12
 Kelly Arnold, politician
 Andru Bemis, musician
 Scott Crary, director, producer, and writer
 Riley Smith, actor
 April 13
 Kyle Howard, actor
 Chris Sligh, singer
 April 15
 Austin Aries, wrestler
 Milton Bradley, baseball player
 Chris Stapleton, country singer and guitarist
 April 16 – Duane Betts, singer/songwriter and guitarist for The Allman Betts Band
 April 17 – Tarn Adams, computer game programmer
 April 18
 Ajmal Ahmady, Afghan-born economist and politician
 Pat Batteaux, football player
 April 19
 K. Tempest Bradford, science fiction and fantasy author and editor
 James Franco, actor
 Joanna Gaines, television personality, host, and chef
 April 20
 Rebecca Makkai, novelist and short story writer
 Matthew Wilkas,  actor, playwright, and television personality
 April 21
 Molly Bloom, author
 Branden Steineckert, drummer for Rancid and The Used (2001–2006)
 April 22 – Manu Intiraymi, actor
 April 23 – Ian Brennan, screenwriter, director and actor
 April 24
 Tim Bainey Jr., stock car racing driver
 Marcus Brunson, sprinter
 April 25 – Ben Bridwell, singer/songwriter and frontman for Band of Horses
 April 26
 Avant, R&B singer
 Joe Crede, baseball player
 Stana Katic, Canadian-born actress
 Pablo Schreiber, Canadian-born actor
 April 27 – Jim James, guitarist and frontman for My Morning Jacket
 April 28 – Robert Oliveri, actor
 April 29 – Bob and Mike Bryan, tennis team and twin brothers
 April 30 – Kim Black, Olympic swimmer

May

 May 1 
 James Badge Dale, actor 
 Nick Traina, singer/songwriter (Link 80) (d. 1997)
 Michael Russell, tennis player
 May 2
 Rob Bruchman, politician
 Shaun T, fitness trainer
 May 3
 Paul Banks, British-born singer, guitarist, and frontman for Interpol
 Walter Bernard, football player
 May 4
 Erin Andrews, television host and personality
 James Harrison, football player
 May 6
 John Abraham, football player
 Erik Anderson, ice hockey player
 May 7
 Brian Clevinger, author 
 Shawn Marion, basketball player
 May 8 – Matthew Davis, actor 
 May 9
 Antwain Britt, mixed martial artist
 Daniel Franzese, actor 
 Aaron Harang, baseball player
 May 10
 Geoff Abrams, tennis player
 Todd Gloria, politician, mayor of San Diego, California
 Kenan Thompson, actor and comedian
 May 11
 Courtney Banghart, basketball player and coach
 Lisa Bender, politician
 Scott Matzka, ice hockey player (d. 2018)  
 May 12
 Malin Akerman, Swedish-born actress and model
 Jason Biggs, actor
 Dee Brown, football player
 Josh Phelps, baseball player
 May 13
 Brooke Anderson, television host and correspondent
 Mike Bibby, basketball player
 Ryan Bukvich, baseball player
 Barry Zito, baseball player 
 May 15
 Josh Burns, mixed martial artist
 David Krumholtz, actor 
 Krissy Taylor, model (d. 1995) 
 May 16
 Josh Arnold, radio personality
 Nick Bierbrodt, baseball player
 Courtney Blades, softball player
 May 17
 Lisa Brennan-Jobs, writer
 Kat Foster, actress
 May 18
 Jeff Anderson, musician
 Carolina Bermudez, radio presenter
 May 19 – Greg Steube, politician
 May 20 – Harold Blackmon, football player
 May 21 – Briana Banks, German-born pornographic actress and model
 May 22
 Meghan Addy, sprinter
 Esao Andrews, painter
 Ginnifer Goodwin, actress
 Daniel Rodimer, wrestler, football player, and political candidate
 May 23 
 Anthony Buich, football player
 Mike Gonzalez, baseball player
 Carolyn Moos, model and basketball player 
 Scott Raynor, drummer
 May 24
 Amy Becher, curler
 Ronald Blackshear, basketball player
 Bryan Greenberg, actor 
 May 25
 Cory Arcangel, post-conceptual artist
 Brian Urlacher, football player  
 May 26
 Rich Brzeski, lacrosse player
 Benji Gregory, actor
 May 27
 Hugo Armando, tennis player
 James Bettcher, football coach
 Adin Brown, soccer player and coach
 May 28
 Adam Robitel, film director, producer, screenwriter, and actor
 Jake Johnson, actor and comedian
 May 29 – Lorenzo Odone, American adrenoleukodystrophy patient (d. 2008)
 May 31 – Eli Bremer, Olympic pentathlete

June

 June 1
 Danny Boyd, football player
 Matthew Hittinger, poet and author
 Link Neal, musician, comedian, and internet personality  
 June 2
 Nikki Cox, actress and comedy writer
 Justin Long, actor
 June 4
 Mike Apple, soccer player
 Scott Cawthon, video game developer and writer
 Josh McDermitt, actor and comedian
 Robin Lord Taylor, actor
 June 5 – Nick Kroll, actor and comedian
 June 6
 Judith Barsi, actress and murder victim (d. 1988)
 Marla Brumfield, basketball player
 J. T. Buck, composer, lyricist, stage director, and project coordinator
 June 7
 Tony Ahn, singer and member of H.O.T.
 Jesse Ball, poet, fiction writer and artist
 Bill Hader, actor
 June 8 – Maria Menounos, actress, journalist, and television presenter
 June 9
 Matt Adamczyk, politician
 Michaela Conlin, actress
 Shandi Finnessey, beauty queen and actress
 Hayden Schlossberg, screenwriter, director, and producer
 June 10
 Raheem Brock, football player
 Mr. Del, Christian rapper and music producer
 DJ Qualls, actor, producer, and model
 Shane West, actor, punk rock musician, and songwriter
 June 11 – Joshua Jackson, Canadian-born actor
 June 12
 David Buchwald, politician
 Jeremy Rowley, character actor and comedian
 Timothy Simons, actor
 Shiloh Strong, actor 
 June 13
 Jake Bronstein, marketer, entrepreneur, internet and television personality, and blogger
 Ethan Embry, actor
 June 14
 Jason Anavitarte, politician
 Clark Boyd, politician
 June 18
 Ben Gleib, media personality 
 Tara Platt, voice actress and actress
 June 19
 Tarise Bryson, basketball player
 Zoe Saldana, actress
 June 20
 Linda Arsenio, actress and model
 Dave Barnes, singer/songwriter
 Amanda Basica, tennis player
 Mike Birbiglia, actor, comedian, and writer  
 Rampage Jackson, mixed martial arts fighter 
 Bobby Seay, baseball player
 June 21 – Michelle Au, anesthesiologist and politician
 June 22 – Champ Bailey, football player 
 June 23
 James Atkins, football player
 Memphis Bleek, rapper
 Jeremy Horn, musician and songwriter
 Nick LaLota, politician
 June 24
 Ariel Pink, musician 
 Adam Pearce, wrestler  
 June 25
 Cookie Belcher, basketball player
 Luke Scott, baseball player
 Marcus Stroud, football player
 June 26
 Rashidi Barnes, football player
 Tavorris Bell, streetball player
 June 27
 Malik Allen, basketball player
 Scott Bower, soccer player
 Courtney Ford, actress
 Marc Terenzi, pop singer
 June 28 – Courtney Burton, boxer
 June 29
 Charlamagne tha God, radio and TV personality
 Sam Farrar, bassist for Phantom Planet (1994-2012) and Maroon 5
 Nicole Scherzinger, actress and singer
 June 30
 LaVar Arrington, football player
 Chris Bos, politician
 Pat Dennis, American football player 
 Jason Schimmel, musician and producer
 Nate Winkel, soccer player

July

 July 1
 Edwina Brown, basketball player
 Hillary Tuck, actress
 July 2 – Kathryn Sophia Belle, philosopher and professor
 July 3
 Ian Anthony Dale, actor
 Jon Anik, mixed martial artist
 Cornelius Anthony, football player
 Steve Bernal, soccer player
 Jesse Leach, singer and frontman for Killswitch Engage
 Alex Scales, basketball player
 July 4
 Becki Newton, actress
 Tony Reali, sports personality
 July 6
 Adam Busch, actor, director, and singer
 Tia and Tamera Mowry, actresses and twins
 July 7
 Chris Andersen, basketball player
 Jesse Ball, novelist and poet
 July 8
 Jenny Adams, hurdler
 Rachael Lillis, actress
 Erin Morgenstern, artist and author
 July 9
 Kyle Davis, actor
 Sundance Head, singer
 Jesse Watters, political commentator and talk show host
 July 10 – Jesse Lacey, singer/songwriter
 July 12
 Jim Arthur, football coach
 Topher Grace, actor
 Michelle Rodriguez, actress
 July 13 – Jessica Barth, actress
 July 14 – Mike Burns, baseball player
 July 15
 Matt Mitrione, mixed martial artist
 Greg Sestero, actor, filmmaker, model and author
 July 16 – Brian Bianchini, model and actor (d. 2004)
 July 17
 Mike Knox, wrestler
 Panda Bear, musician
 Mike Pellicciotti, politician
 July 18
 Crystal Mangum, murderer responsible for making false rape allegations in the Duke lacrosse case
 Ben Sheets, baseball player
 July 19 – R. J. Williams, media and Internet entrepreneur, and former child actor
 July 20
 Chris Sligh, singer-songwriter and producer 
 Will Solomon, basketball player
 Elliott Yamin, singer
 July 21
 Justin Bartha, actor
 Beer City Bruiser, wrestler
 Josh Hartnett, actor
 Brandon Heath, singer/songwriter
 July 22
 Ian Allen, football player
 Candace Kroslak, actress
 July 23 – Lauren Groff, fiction writer
 July 24 – Michael Boireau, football player
 July 25
 Teresa Benitez-Thompson, politician
 Elizabeth Ann Bennett, actress
 Gerard Warren, football player
 July 26 – Major Applewhite, football player and coach
 July 27
 Matthew Beaton, political figure and business executive
 Sandra Colton, dancer
 July 28 – Julian Peterson, football player
 July 29 – Mike Adams, baseball player
 July 30
 Josh Bonifay, baseball player
 Brian Sicknick, police officer who was killed during the United States Capitol attack (d. 2021)
 Nikema Williams, politician
 July 31
 Zac Brown, country singer/songwriter, guitarist, and frontman for Zac Brown Band
 Nick Sorensen, football player and sportscaster

August

 August 3 – Shanelle Workman, actress
 August 4
 Luke Allen, baseball player (d. 2022)
 Michael Brown, producer and filmmaker
 Kurt Busch, stock car racing driver
 August 5
 Will Allen, football player
 Bryan Bracey, basketball player
 Nick Bradford, basketball player
 Henry Buchanan, boxer
 August 6
 Marisa Miller, supermodel
 Freeway, rapper
 August 8
 Kurt Anderson, football player and coach
 Countess Vaughn, actress
 August 10
 Cory Bird, football player
 Jesse Boulerice, ice hockey player
 August 12
 Pazuzu Algarad, Satanist and convicted murderer (d. 2015)
 Derrick Burgess, football player
 August 13 – Michael Bennett, football player
 August 15
 Jennie Eisenhower, actress
 Kerri Walsh Jennings, beach volleyball player
 August 18
 Kevin Barry, baseball player
 Jaclyn Bernstein, actress
 Andy Samberg, actor
 August 19
 David Boston, football player
 Chris Capuano, baseball player
 August 20
 Noah Bean, actor
 Monty Beisel, football player
 Freddie Bruno, Christian hip hop musician
 August 21 – Reuben Droughns, football player
 August 23
 Kenny Bartram, freestyle motocross rider
 Kobe Bryant, basketball player (d. 2020)
 Julian Casablancas, singer/songwriter and musician
 August 24 – Beth Riesgraf, actress
 August 25 – Kel Mitchell, actor
 August 26
 Ben Archibald, football player
 Drew Bennett, football player
 Patrick Brown, engineer, producer, and studio owner
 Cedric Burnside, blues musician
 Julian Casablancas, singer/songwriter and musician
 August 28
 Jess Margera, drummer for CKY
 Kelly Overton, actress
 Rachel Kimsey, actress
 August 30 – Rodregis Brooks, football player
 August 31 – Adam Laxalt, politician

September

 September 2 – Courtland Bullard, football player
 September 4
 Lamont Barnes, basketball player
 Wes Bentley, actor
 September 6
 Cisco Adler, musician and record producer
 Frank Brooks, baseball player
 Adrienne Maree Brown, writer, activist, and facilitator
 Foxy Brown, rapper
 September 7 – Sarah E. Buxton, politician
 September 8 – Steve Barnett, politician
 September 9
 Kurt Ainsworth, baseball player
 Shane Battier, basketball player
 Rod Brown, basketball player
 September 10 – Russ Buller, pole vaulter
 September 11 – Ed Reed, football player
 September 12
 Tess Brunet, musician and producer
 Ben McKenzie, actor
 Ruben Studdard, singer and American Idol winner
 September 13
 Marlyne Barrett, actress
 Swizz Beatz, record producer and rapper
 Bryan Bishop, radio personality
 Megan Henning, actress
 September 14
 Kenderick Allen, football player
 Bruce Branch, football player
 Ron DeSantis, politician, 46th Governor of Florida
 Teddy Park, rapper and member of 1TYM
 Matthew Rogers, singer and TV host
 September 15 – Charles Grigsby, singer
 September 16
 Mike Battle, digital restoration artist and animation color modelist
 Jarvis Borum, football player
 Ralph Brown, football player
 Stephanie Murphy, Vietnamese-born politician
 Brian Sims, politician
 September 17 – Karen Akunowicz, chef, cookbook author, and television personality
 September 18 – Billy Eichner, actor and comedian
 September 20 – Jason Bay, Canadian-born baseball player
 September 21 – Josh Thomson, mixed martial artist
 September 23
 Anthony Mackie, actor
 Worm Miller, screenwriter, director and, actor
 Keri Lynn Pratt, actress
 September 24 – Chris Bala, ice hockey player
 September 25
 Bob Abrahamian, deejay (d. 2014)
 Danny Basavich, pool player
 Joe Miñoso, actor
 September 26 – business executive and arts administrator, executive director of the American Ballet Theatre
 September 27
 Andrea Alù, Italian-born scientist and engineer
 Brad Arnold, singer, drummer, and frontman for 3 Doors Down
 Kole Ayi, football player
 September 28
 Jarin Blaschke, cinematographer
 Dane Boedigheimer, internet personality
 Lucas Bryant, Canadian-born actor
 Nikki McKibbin, singer (d. 2020)
 September 29 – Mohini Bhardwaj, Olympic artistic gymnast
 September 30 – Candice Michelle, wrestler and model

October

 October 1
 Katie Aselton, actress
 Nicole Atkins, singer/songwriter
 Will Bartholomew, football player
 Tony Beckham, football player
 October 2 – Deanna Ballard, politician
 October 3
 Jarrett Bellini, writer and journalist
 Jake Shears, singer/songwriter
 Shannyn Sossamon, actress
 October 4
 Dana Davis, actress
 Phillip Glasser, actor and producer
 October 5
 Lindsey Pearlman, actress (d. 2022)
 James Valentine, pop rock guitarist for Maroon 5
 October 6
 Sarah Brusco, Christian musician
 Correll Buckhalter, football player
 Victoria Spartz, Ukrainian-born politician
 October 7 – Omar Benson Miller, actor
 October 8 – Sri Preston Kulkarni, politician
 October 9
 Ben Diamond, politician
 Kristy Kowal, Olympic swimmer
 October 10
 Brandon Barnes, drummer for Rise Against
 Dan Bellino, MLB umpire
 Casey Benjamin, saxophonist, vocoderist, keyboardist, producer, and songwriter
 October 11
 Damian Adams, wrestler
 Carl Bussey, soccer player
 October 14
 Justin Brannan, politician
 Ryan Church, baseball player
 Usher Raymond, R&B singer-songwriter
 Javon Walker, football player
 October 15 – Wes Moore, author, entrepreneur, television producer, and Army veteran
 October 16 – Mersim Beskovic, soccer player
 October 18
 Brian Brown, dirt track racing driver
 Jake Farrow, television writer and actor
 Wesley Jonathan, actor
 October 20
 David Caspe, writer, producer, and director
 Mike Levin, politician
 Dionne Quan, voice actress
 October 21
 Will Estes, actor
 Joey Harrington, football player
 October 23
 Bo Biteman, politician
 John Lackey, baseball player
 October 24
 Kylie Bivens, soccer player
 Chris Bootcheck, baseball player
 Seth Moulton, politician
 October 25
 Zachary Knighton, actor
 David T. Little, composer and drummer
 October 26
 Tyondai Braxton, composer and musician
 Byron Donalds, politician
 CM Punk, wrestler and martial artist
 Antonio Pierce, football player
 October 27
 Stephanie Abrams, meteorologist
 Andrew Bell, British-born artist and founder of Dead Zebra Inc.
 Dusty Bonner, football player
 David Walton, actor
 October 28
 Rebecca Bauer-Kahan, politician
 Justin Guarini, singer and American Idol contestant
 October 29 – Travis Henry, football player
 October 30 – Matthew Morrison, actor and singer

November

 November 1
 Big Kuntry King, rapper
 Jeremy Glazer, actor
 Mary Kate Schellhardt, actress
 Jessica Valenti, blogger and writer
 November 2 – William D. Swenson, Army Lt. Colonel and Medal of Honor Recipient
 November 3
 Jaime Herrera Beutler, politician
 Tim McIlrath, singer and frontman for Rise Against
 November 5 – Bubba Watson, golfer
 November 6
 Keith Aucoin, ice hockey player
 Ainsley Battles, football player
 Nicole Dubuc, actress and writer
 Taryn Manning, actress
 November 7 – Elisabeth Bachman, volleyball player
 November 8 – Michael Boggs, Christian musician
 November 9 
 Steven López, martial artist
 Sisqó, actor and singer
 November 10
 Diplo, DJ and music producer
 Eve, rapper
 November 11 – Aaron Bruno, singer/songwriter and frontman for Awolnation
 November 13
 Chad Beasley, football player
 Josh Blackburn, ice hockey player
 November 14 
 Bobby Allen, ice hockey player
 Dustin Burrows, politician
 Xavier Nady, baseball player and coach
 Chris Shar, rock drummer 
 November 15 – Floyd Womack, football player
 November 16
 Kip Bouknight, baseball player
 Orshawante Bryant, football player
 November 17 – Reggie Wayne, football player
 November 18 – Daniel Chong, animator
 November 19
 Jeff Bailey, baseball player
 Roxana Brusso, Peruvian-born actress
 Chad Doreck, actor
 November 20 – Amy Kennedy, politician
 November 22
 Anthony Brindisi, politician
 Karen O, singer/songwriter and musician
 November 23 – Destin Daniel Cretton, director
 November 24
 Gary Baxter, football player
 Katherine Heigl, actress
 November 25 – Joe Borchard, baseball player
 November 26 – Cristin O'Keefe Aptowicz, nonfiction writer and poet
 November 27 – Josh Blue, comedian
 November 28
 Brent Albright, wrestler
 Jerametrius Butler, football player
 Aimee Garcia, actress
 November 29
 Fred Akshar, politician
 Heather Bown, volleyball player
 Lauren German, actress
 November 30
 Clay Aiken, singer, American Idol contestant, and politician
 Jordan Belfi, actor
 Robert Kirkman, comic book writer

December

 December 1
 Heather Aldama, soccer player
 Ron Browz, recording artist and record producer
 Mat Kearney, singer/songwriter and musician
 Jen Psaki, political advisor, White House Press Secretary (2021-2022)
 December 4
 Miri Ben-Ari, Israeli-born musician, producer, and humanitarian
 Jamie Bochert, model and musician
 Cory Bradford, basketball player
 December 5
 Neil Druckmann, Israeli-born video game writer and programmer, founder of Naughty Dog
 David Hodges, singer/songwriter and record producer
 December 6
 K. D. Aubert, actress, fashion model, and singer
 Chris Başak, baseball player
 Jason Bulger, baseball player
 December 7
 Jaime Ambriz, soccer player
 Shiri Appleby, actress
 Idrees Bashir, football player
 Jeff Nichols, director and screenwriter
 Ronald J. Shurer, army medic (d. 2020)
 December 8
 Mike Barr, football player
 Kenny Brunner, basketball player
 Ian Somerhalder, actor
 Vernon Wells, baseball player
 December 9
 Nick Bruel, author
 Jesse Metcalfe, actor
 December 10
 John Arigo, basketball player
 Brandon Novak, motivational speaker, author, skateboarder, and stunt performer
 Summer Phoenix, actress
 December 11 – Courtney Henggeler, actress
 December 12
 Brandon Adams, poker player
 Teryn Ashley, tennis player
 Erick Baker, singer/songwriter
 December 13 – Cameron Douglas, actor
 December 14 – Cedric Bonner, football player
 December 15
 Coffey Anderson, country singer/songwriter
 Ned Brower, drummer and vocalist for Rooney
 Jerome McDougle, American football player
 December 16
 Scott Bailey, actor
 Eric 'Kaine' Jackson, rapper and member of Ying Yang Twins
 December 17
 Beau Burchell, guitarist and vocalist for Saosin
 Chase Utley, baseball player
 December 18 
 Chad Brown, horse trainer
 Michael Christopher Brown, photographer
 Josh Dallas, actor
 Katie Holmes, actress
 December 19 – Patrick Casey, screenwriter and actor
 December 20 – Jacqueline Saburido, Venezuelan-born social activist (d. 2019)
 December 22 – Danny Ahn, rapper for g.o.d
 December 23
 P. J. Alexander, football player
 Andra Davis, football player
 December 24 – Tony Angelo, drift racer and stunt driver
 December 25 – Jeremy Strong, actor
 December 27 – Yasemin Besen–Cassino, sociologist and professor
 December 28
 John Legend, R&B singer/songwriter
 August Pfluger, politician
 December 29
 B-Boy, wrestler
 LaToya London, singer
 Angelo Taylor, athlete
 December 30
 Sari Anderson, multisport and endurance athlete
 Devin Brown, basketball player
 Vanessa Short Bull, beauty pageant titleholder
 Tyrese Gibson, singer/songwriter, rapper, actor, model, and screenwriter
 December 31 – Craig Wayne Boyd, country music singer

Full Date Unknown 

 Eric Abrahamsen, translator for the Chinese language
 Stella Abrera, Philippine-born ballerina
 Deborah Ager, poet
 Tanya Aguiñiga, artist
 Allison Ahlfeldt, Paralympic volleyball player
 Nilo Alcala, Philippine-born composer
 Dick Allen, bowler
 Kalliope Amorphous, artist
 Ryan G. Anderson, convicted terrorist
 Apexer, artist
 Bomani Armah, vocalist
 Josh Azzarella, artist
 Christian Baldini, opera and orchestra conductor
 Audrey Barcio, artist
 Simon Barrett, actor, producer, and screenwriter
 Zoltan Bathory, Hungarian-born guitarist for Five Finger Death Punch
 Matt Bean, journalist
 Claire Beckett, photographer
 Vaughn Bell, artist
 Christopher Belmonte, radio personality
 Stacey Bendet, fashion designer and founder of Alice + Olivia
 Ruha Benjamin, Indian-born sociologist and professor
 Paul Bennecke, political consultant
 Jenn Bennett, German-born author and novelist
 Kathryn Biber, lawyer and political counsel
 Melanie Bilenker, artist
 Margot Black, tenant rights organizer, activist, grass-roots lobbyist, and political candidate
 Sara Black, artist
 Craig Blais, poet
 M. Blash, director, screenwriter, actor, and visual artist
 Evan Blass, blogger, editor, and phone leaker
 J. T. Blatty, photojournalist and Army Captain
 Kevin Blechdom, experimental electronic musician and performance artist
 Jaswinder Bolina, poet
 William Michael Boyle, author
 Alex Brewer, artist
 Sean Brock, chef
 Kelsey Brookes, artist
 Julia Brown, artist
 Laurie Brown, photographer
 Kasey Buckles, professor of economics
 Noah Buschel, director and screenwriter
 Rhett Ayers Butler, journalist and author

Deaths

 January 3 – Jack Oakie, actor (born 1903)
 January 9 – Robert Daniel Murphy, diplomat (born 1894)
 January 13 – Hubert H. Humphrey, 38th Vice President of the United States from 1965 to 1969 (born 1911)
 January 14 – Kurt Gödel, mathematician (born 1906 in Austria-Hungary)
 January 20 – Gilbert Highet, classicist, academic, writer, intellectual, critic and literary historian (born 1906 in Scotland)
 February 14 – Claude Binyon, screenwriter and director (born 1905)
 February 16 – Edward Lindberg, Olympic track athlete (born 1886)
 February 18 – Maggie McNamara, actress (born 1928)
 February 22
 Phyllis McGinley, children's story writer and poet (born 1905)
 C. Paul Jennewein, sculptor (born 1890 in Germany)
 Dennie Moore, actress (born 1902)
 Ernest Palmer, cinematographer (born 1885)
 March 13 – John Cazale, film actor (born 1935)
 March 18
 Leigh Brackett, science fiction author (born 1915)
 Peggy Wood, actress (born 1892)
 March 19 – Faith Baldwin, romantic novelist and poet (born 1893)
 March 22
 Sonora Smart Dodd, founder of Father's Day (born 1882)
 Karl Wallenda, circus performer (born 1905)
 John Hall Wheelock, poet (born 1886)
 April 16 – Lucius D. Clay, military governor of Germany from 1947 to 1949 (born 1897)
 April 21 – Thomas Wyatt Turner, civil rights activist, biologist and educator; first African American to receive a doctorate from Cornell (born 1877)
 May 6 – Ethelda Bleibtrey, Olympic swimmer (born 1902)
 May 12 – Louis Zukofsky, modernist poet (born 1904)
 May 16 – William Steinberg, conductor (born 1899)
 May 22
 Joe Colombo, gangster (born 1914)
 Aubrey Fitch, admiral (born 1883)
 June 3 – Frank Stanford, poet, suicide (born 1948)
 June 18 – Walter C. Alvarez, physician and writer (born 1884)
 July 18 – Claude P. Dettloff, photographer (born 1899)
 August 14 – Joe Venuti, jazz violinist (born 1903)
 August 21 – Charles Eames, architect and designer (born 1907)
 August 24 – Louis Prima, swing singer and bandleader (born 1910)
 August 26 – Charles Boyer, film actor (born 1899 in France)
 August 27 – Gordon Matta-Clark, artist, cancer (born 1943)
 August 28 – Bruce Catton, Civil War historian, Pulitzer Prize winner in 1954 (born 1899)
 August 31 – Lee Garmes, cinematographer (born 1899)
 September 23 – Lyman Bostock, baseball player, killed (born 1950)
 September 24 – Ruth Etting, "torch" singer (born 1897)
 September 30 – Edgar Bergen, actor and ventriloquist (born 1903)
 October 8 – Bertha Cody, Native American archaeologist (born 1907)
 October 10 – Ralph Metcalfe, sprinter and U.S. Congressman (born 1910)
 October 12 – Nancy Spungen, groupie and girlfriend of Sid Vicious, killed (born 1958)
 October 16 – Dan Dailey, actor (born 1915)
 October 19 – Gig Young, actor (born 1913)
 November 7 – Cattle Annie, outlaw with Little Britches (born 1882)
 November 8 – Norman Rockwell, painter and illustrator (born 1894)
 November 15 – Margaret Mead, cultural anthropologist (born 1901)
 November 18 – Jim Jones, American cult leader (born 1931)
 November 25 – Elaine Esposito, coma victim (born 1934)
 November 27 – Harvey Milk, politician and gay activist, killed (born 1930)
 December 3 – William Grant Still, "the Dean" of African American composers (born 1895)
 December 10 – Ed Wood, American filmmaker, actor, writer, producer and director (born 1924)
 December 27 – Chris Bell, guitarist, singer and songwriter (born 1951)
 December 28 – Harry Winston, diamond dealer (born 1896)

See also 
 1978 in American soccer
 1978 in American television
 List of American films of 1978
 Timeline of United States history (1970–1989)

References

External links
 

 
1970s in the United States
United States
United States
Years of the 20th century in the United States